Jason Mathew Smith (born 20 October 1974) is an Australian former professional basketball player. On 10 October 2013, Smith was named in the Sydney Kings 25th Anniversary Team.

Professional career
Smith's career began with the South East Melbourne Magic and was just starting to find his feet when the club folded. Smith then signed with new franchise Victoria Titans who elected to keep his contract. Smith contributed to the success of the Titans that saw them reach consecutive Grand Finals, in 1999 and 2000, of which they did not win. Victoria soon folded and Smith signed a contract with the Sydney Kings. Although Smith struggled during his first season with Sydney, he excelled during the playoff series, leading Sydney Kings to an NBL championship and Smith was named Grand Final MVP. Outside of the NBL, Smith has had a few short stints in Europe where he played on Croatian team Cibona Zagreb and two Italian teams; Rida Scafati and Scavolini Pesaro. On 18 June 2009, Smith announced his retirement from basketball.

National team career
From 1999 to 2009, Smith played for the Australia men's national basketball team, the Boomers. He represented Australia at the 2000 Sydney and 2004 Athens Olympic Games as well as the 2006 Commonwealth Games and Captained the Boomers at the 2006 FIBA World Championship in Japan

Personal
Smith is a Christian.

References

External links
Basketball Australia Profile

1974 births
Living people
Australian Christians
Australian expatriate basketball people in Croatia
Australian expatriate basketball people in Italy
Australian expatriate basketball people in the United States
Australian men's basketball players
Basketball players at the 2000 Summer Olympics
Basketball players at the 2004 Summer Olympics
Basketball players at the 2006 Commonwealth Games
Basketball players from Melbourne
Cal Lutheran Kingsmen basketball players
Commonwealth Games gold medallists for Australia
Commonwealth Games medallists in basketball
KK Cibona players
Olympic basketball players of Australia
Scafati Basket players
Shooting guards
Small forwards
South East Melbourne Magic players
Sydney Kings players
Victoria Titans players
2006 FIBA World Championship players
Medallists at the 2006 Commonwealth Games